Lower Kuskokwim School District (LKSD), or Bethel Public Schools, is a school district headquartered in Bethel, Alaska.  it is the largest rural school district in the state, with 4,300 students.

Employment and teacher demographics
In 2017 it had about 300 certified teachers, with about 20% being Alaska Natives, the highest percentage of any Alaskan school district.

The district, as of 2017, pays for the education of prospective teachers, sending them to University of Alaska Fairbanks (UAF); the district pays all of a student's costs if they go to UAF; the LKSD board also offers scholarships for students attending other universities. The stipulation is that students who get the scholarships are obligated to teach at LKSD, with one year of teaching per year of scholarship. In 2013 LKSD began requiring teachers without university degrees to work towards getting them, and in 2017 it set a ten-year deadline for doing so. Most of its non-certified teachers taught in rural schools. According to Alaska state law a person without a university degree may still become a full-time teacher if he/she has fluency in a native language of Alaska. The district prioritizes hiring teachers with Yupik language skills and has a preference for local teachers.

In the period 2007-2012 it had an annual teacher turnover rate of 15%, or 60-70 teaching jobs, lower than many rural school districts though higher than urban ones.

Schools

Bethel schools
Regular:
 Bethel Regional High School
 Gladys Jung Elementary School
 Jung, previously known as the Kilbuck School, serves grades 3–6.  its enrollment is about 345.
 Mekelnguut Elitnauriviat School
 Nicknamed the "M.E. School," it serves grades Kindergarten through 2.  it has 260 students and 18 teachers.
 Ayaprun Elitnaurvik School
It is a K-6 Yup’ik-English bilingual program that originated from a total immersion language program established in 1995.  the school had 197 students. The school occupies space in Mekelnguut Elitnauriviat and Gladys Jung schools;  grades Kindergarten through 1 are in the former and the remainder are in the latter.

Other:
 Kuskokwim Learning Academy (KLA) - Bethel

Rural PreK-12 schools
 Joann A. Alexie Memorial School - Atmautluak
  it has about 118 students.
 Chaputnguak School & Amaqigciq School - Chefornak
 "Chaputnguak," an old name for Chefornak, is a Yup'ik word referring to an object or thing obstructing a pathway, while the latter is named after the first inhabitant of Chefornak, Alexie Amaqigciq.
 Eek School
  it has 120 students. It is a bilingual school.
 Rocky Mountain School - Goodnews Bay
  it has one of the lowest enrollments in LKSD as it has 54 students.
 Kasigluk-Akula Elitnaurvik School - Kasigluk
 It is a bilingual English-Yugtun school.  it has about 120 students.
 Kasigluk Akiuk Memorial School - Kasigluk
  it has about 100 students.
 Chief Paul Memorial School - Kipnuk
  it has 190 students.
 Ayagina’ar Elitnaurvik School - Kongiganak
  it serves 174 students.
 Ket’acik & Apaalluk  Memorial School - Kwethluk
  it has about 250 students and 15 teachers.
 Kwigillingok School - Kwigillingok
  it has about 119 students, 12 teachers, and 10 other employees.
 Nuniwarmiut School - Mekoryuk
 In 1984 the building was constructed.
 William N. Miller Memorial School - Napakiak
  it has 96 students.
 Zacharias John Williams Memorial School - Napaskiak
  it has 155 students, with 90% classified as learners of English as a second language, 85% are on free or reduced lunch programs, and the majority are of Central Yupik Eskimo origins; that year only two students were not Yupik. That year the school had 34 employees, with four of them being native Alaskans; the employees included 16 teachers. The current building opened in October 2016, and the original building opened in 1982.
 Ayaprun School - Newtok (moving to Mertarvik)
  the school has 128 students, 12 teachers, and 27 other employees. Mertarvik Pioneer School is the continuation, as people from Newtok are moving to Mertarvik due to erosion of the former.  As of 2020 it uses temporary facilities in the Mertarvik Education Center (MEC) before a permanent school is to be constructed. The school has teachers using English and Yugtun as mediums of instruction. The Mertarvik school's initial enrollment was 10 and it began operations on October 14, 2019. It initially had four teachers with half using each language as a medium.
 Negtemiut Elitnaurviat School - Nightmute
 Anna Tobeluk Memorial School - Nunapitchuk
  the school had 203 students, 15 certified teachers, and 16 classified employees. English is the sole language of instruction at Tobeluk.
 Qugcuun Memorial School - Oscarville
  the school had 13 students. It is a bilingual English-Yup'ik school.
 Arviq School - Platinum
 Due to a decline in student enrollment it closed in Spring 2001, but it reopened in October 2007.  the school had 20 students.
 Kuinerrarmiut Elitnaurviat School - Quinhagak
 Nelson Island School - Toksook Bay
 Lewis Angapak Memorial School - Tuntutuliak
  the students are Yupik people.
 Paul T. Albert Memorial School (PTAMS) - Tununak
 It is a bilingual English-Yugtun school.  there are about 108 students at the school, all Alaska Natives. In 2003 it was the building of the largest size in Tununak. Kimberly C. Price, who formerly taught at the school, stated that students are in mainly Yupik speaking houses and generally retain fluency of the language.

References
Made by a former employee:

Notes

External links
 

School districts in Alaska
Bethel, Alaska
Bethel Census Area, Alaska